Hugh Allan (27 August 1865 – 5 April 1949) was a Liberal party member of the House of Commons of Canada. He was born in Blenheim Township, Canada West and became a clerk, conveyancer and notary.

Allan attended Richwood School in Oxford County. He became a municipal clerk and treasurer.

He was elected to Parliament at the Oxford North riding in the 1926 general election when he defeated Conservative incumbent Donald Sutherland. After serving his only term, the 16th Canadian Parliament, Allan was defeated by Sutherland in the 1930 federal election.

References

External links
 

1865 births
1949 deaths
Liberal Party of Canada MPs
Members of the House of Commons of Canada from Ontario
People from Oxford County, Ontario